Pedro Jiménez León (born 14 February 1958) is a Mexican politician from the Citizens' Movement. From 2009 to 2012 he served as Deputy of the LXI Legislature of the Mexican Congress representing Tabasco.

References

1958 births
Living people
Politicians from Tabasco
Citizens' Movement (Mexico) politicians
21st-century Mexican politicians
Deputies of the LXI Legislature of Mexico
Members of the Chamber of Deputies (Mexico) for Tabasco